Village Sounds Agency is an Australian booking agency that represents the live touring of Australasian artists.

Background & Agency Growth 
Founded in 1999 by Powderfinger booking agent Jessica Ducrou, the agency has grown to have offices in Byron Bay, Sydney & Melbourne. Ducrou started in the music industry working at Rolling Stone Magazine and later booking the Lansdowne Hotel in Sydney. Prior to starting Village Sounds Agency, in 1996 Ducrou founded Homebake festival in partnership with International Music Concepts (IMC) with a debut lineup that included Grinspoon, Silverchair, Spiderbait and more.
 
In 2001, Ducrou and Paul Piticco co-founded the annual Byron Bay festival Splendour in the Grass to give Powderfinger a platform to perform on. Village Sounds was the primary presenter of Splendour in the Grass from 2001 to 2016, when the company merged with Secret Sounds.
 
In 2008, Evan Davis of The Harbour Agency joined Village Sounds Agency and was subsequently named in The Music Network’s 30 Under 30 in 2010.
  
In 2016, Village Sounds Agency was brought under the umbrella of Secret Sounds which consists of Splendour in the Grass, Falls Music & Arts Festival, Secret Sounds Touring, Secret Service Artist Management, Dew Process, Create/Control, Dew Process Publishing, Secret Sounds Brand Partnerships, Whole Lot of Love, and Secret Service Public Relations.
 
In 2016, Jessica Ducrou and Paul Piticco were named #2 in The Music’s annual Power 50, listing the top 50 most powerful people in the Australian Music Industry.

Artist Roster 
As of July 2018, Village Sounds represents the careers of:

 360
 Airling
 ALTA
 Ara Koufax
 Art vs Science
 The Babe Rainbow
 Bad//Dreems
 Bernard Fanning
 Big Scary
 Birds of Tokyo
 Cameron Avery
 CC:DISCO!
 Christopher Port
 Cloud Control
 Courtney Barnett
 Cub Sport
 The Creases
 DMA’S
 DRELLER
 DRO CAREY
 Dune Rats
 Fascinator
 Fazerdaze
 Fractures
 G Flip
 The Grates
 Green Buzzard
 Gyroscope
 Hatchie
 Hockey Dad
 Illy
 Jarrow
 The Kite String Tangle
 Last Dinosaurs
 The Living End
 Mansionair
 Megan Washington
 The Mess Hall
 Methyl Ethel
 Moohki
 No Mono
 Obscura Hail
 Ocean Grove
 Oh Pep!
 PEZ
 Seekae
 Super Cruel
 Totally Mild
 Touch Sensitive
 Tropical Fuck Storm
 Vallis Alps
 Vance Joy
 Violent Soho
 Wafia
 Ziggy Ramo

References

External links 
 
 Ex-EMI Exec Named Village Sounds Group CEO
 Village Sounds opens office in Singapore
 Village Sounds and The Atlas Agency merge

Australian companies established in 1999
Talent and literary agencies